Bikram is a town and Block in Paliganj sub-division (Tehsil) of Patna district in the Indian state of Bihar.

Politics
Bikram assembly constituency is part of Pataliputra (Lok Sabha constituency). Bikram assembly constituency covers Naubatpur and Bikram community development blocks, and Kaoria, Bindaul, Kunwa, Machchhalpur Lai, Yamunapur, and Taranagar gram panchayats of Bihta Community Development Block.

List of villages
The list of villages in Bikram Block (under Paliganj Tehsil) is as follows: (GP is Gram Panchayat).

References

Cities and towns in Patna district